Simei is a subzone located in the eastern part of Singapore, situated within the town of Tampines. The name Simei is pinyin for "Four Beauties" in Chinese. Formerly known as Tampines South, it was officially renamed to Simei in 1985.

History and Etymology
The name "Simei" is the Pinyinized version of "Soo Bee", after a short minor lane off Jalan Angin Laut, Jalan Soo Bee. It acquired its name during the height of a government policy of "Pinyinization". The current MP serving the Changi-Simei constituency is Jessica Tan.

Simei used to be a Malay kampung. A large part of it was a Chinese cemetery called Hwa San Tng. It was cleared in February 1982 to make way for the HDB estate at Simei. For a brief period, the roads in the estate were named after the legendary Four Beauties (i.e. Xi Shi, Wang Zhaojun, Diaochan and Yang Guifei) in Chinese history. These confusing names were swiftly changed following complaints.

Facilities

Simei is a well-developed estate with plenty of amenities and facilities. There are schools, an MRT station, coffee shops and a shopping mall, Eastpoint Mall. While outside of Simei there is also Singapore Expo, Changi Business Park and Changi City Point nearby. Commercial tenants of the shopping centres include restaurants, supermarkets, department stores, bookstores, jewellery and gift shops.

NTUC FairPrice, a leading supermarket chain in Singapore, is located on the 5th floor of Eastpoint Mall for 24 hours. 7-Eleven is a 24-hour convenience store located near Simei MRT station. Giant is located under Simei MRT station and operates 24 hours daily. Simei Park is the only park in Simei, consisting of a playground, elderly fitness corner and running tracks. There are different kinds of residential dwellings in the area, comprising landed properties, condominiums, mansions and public housing flats. For medical needs, Changi General Hospital is located here as well, and serves many Singaporeans living in the eastern area.

Amenities

There are wide range of amenities at Simei, including Changi General Hospital, retail outlets and the Changi Simei community centre.

Education facilities situated in the town include ITE College East, the Metta Development School, Changkat Primary School, Changkat Changi Secondary School, as well as the Singapore University of Technology and Design. Being in between Bedok and Tampines, residents are within reach of even more amenities.

Transport

Simei is well served by public transport. Most of the town is within 10 minutes walking distance from Simei MRT station. It also enjoys close proximity to Singapore Changi Airport via the Pan Island Expressway. Public bus services that serve Simei's town centre, the MRT station and the outskirts include 2, 5, 9, 10, 12, Express 12e, 17, 20, 24, 31, 35, 35M, 38, 47, 48, 118, 531, 753 and TS1. Short-trip bus services that also serve Simei include 9A, 31A, 118A and 118B. Public bus services that ply express sectors along Simei Flyover on the PIE, Simei Avenue and Upper Changi Road East include 27, Express 513, Express 518A and City Direct 661. 

Mass Transport System
 Simei
 Upper Changi
 Expo
 Xilin (future)

Xilin MRT station will be a future station as part of DTL3 extension. It will be completed in 2024 in tandem with the opening of the Stage 4 of the Thomson–East Coast line.

References

 
Places in Singapore